Theodore Rodger Kubiak (born May 12, 1942) is an American former professional baseball player and manager. He played as an infielder in Major League Baseball from  through , most notably as a member of the Oakland Athletics dynasty that won three consecutive World Series championships between 1972 and 1974. He also played for the Milwaukee Brewers, St. Louis Cardinals, Texas Rangers, and the San Diego Padres.

Baseball career
Kubiak grew up in Highland Park, New Jersey and is a graduate of Highland Park High School, class of 1960. He was signed by the Kansas City Athletics as an amateur free agent before the 1961 baseball season. He played in the minor leagues for six seasons before making his major league debut at the age of 24 with the Athletics on April 14, 1967. The Athletics franchise moved from Kansas City to Oakland, California prior to the 1968 season. On December 7, 1969, the Athletics traded Kubiak along with George Lauzerique to the Milwaukee Brewers for Ray Oyler and Diego Segui.

Kubiak produced the best offensive statistics of his career while playing for the Brewers in 1970, posting career-highs in games played (152), batting average (.252), home runs (4) and runs batted in (41). Kubiak still holds the Brewers' record for most RBIs in a single game with 7 (later equalled by 8 other Milwaukee players), which he set at Boston on July 18, 1970, the team's first year in Milwaukee.

Managerial career
Kubiak reentered baseball as a manager and took over as the manager of the Modesto A's in mid-1989 from Lenn Sakata. He remained in Modesto for four more years before joining the Cleveland Indians organization in 1994. He managed the Canton–Akron Indians in 1994 and 1995, then moved down to the New York–Penn League for five years. He was with the Watertown Indians from 1996 to 1998, and the Mahoning Valley Scrappers in 1999 and 2000. He moved up to the Columbus RedStixx in 2001, the Kinston Indians in 2002, then returned to Mahoning Valley in 2003. From 2004 to 2008 he was the minor league defensive coordinator for the Cleveland Indians. In 2009, he returned to managing with the Arizona Extended League Indians, in 2010 managed the Lake County Captains to the Midwest League Championship, and in 2012 he returned to Mahoning Valley to begin his 4th season at the helm of the Scrappers.

References

External links

1942 births
Living people
Kansas City Athletics players
Milwaukee Brewers players
Oakland Athletics players
San Diego Padres players
St. Louis Cardinals players
Texas Rangers players
Major League Baseball infielders
Highland Park High School (New Jersey) alumni
People from Highland Park, New Jersey
Sportspeople from New Brunswick, New Jersey
Major League Baseball second basemen
Major League Baseball third basemen
Major League Baseball shortstops
Minor league baseball managers
Sarasota Sun Sox players
Binghamton Triplets players
Lewiston Broncs players
Dallas Rangers players
Fort Worth Cats players
Austin Senators players
Birmingham Barons players
Vancouver Mounties players
Baseball players from New Jersey